"Wake Up" is a song by American actress and singer Hilary Duff from her first compilation album Most Wanted (2005). Written by Duff and the Dead Executives, a record production team consisting of Jason Epperson, Joel Madden, and Benji Madden, "Wake Up" was crafted with the intention of having a "totally different sound" from Duff's previous material. Although she thought of the work to be a new milestone in her career, she was at the same time nervous about how her fans would react to the material. "Wake Up" was released as the lead single from Most Wanted in the United States on July 12, 2005, by Hollywood Records. It was released also digitally in the United Kingdom on October 24, 2005.

Described by Duff as an '80s-influenced dance-pop song, "Wake Up" is lyrically about going out and having fun. "Wake Up" received mixed reviews from music critics. Some praised it for being "irresistible" and having a fun nature, while others criticized it for its "insipid" lyrics and noted that it sounds like "leftovers" from Duff's previous releases. "Wake Up" achieved mild commercial success, becoming a top-ten hit in Flanders (Belgium), Ireland, Italy, Norway, Spain, and the United Kingdom. It reached the top 40 in several other countries: Australia, the Netherlands, New Zealand, Switzerland and the United States. The accompanying music video form "Wake Up" features Duff leaving her house and attending various nightclubs and parties.

Development 
On May 20, 2005, MTV News reported that Duff would be releasing a new album in August, comprising previously released tracks and four new recordings. It was also announced that preceding the album's release, Duff would begin a 32-date summer concert tour in support of the album. The following month, in an interview with MTV News, Duff said that she had been working with brothers Joel and Benji Madden of American rock band Good Charlotte and Jason Epperson (together known under the production name the Dead Executives) to write and produce new songs for the compilation. She said that " ... they're three of my favorite songs I've ever done. ... It was really fun being in the studio with them." Described by Duff as the first time when "all the responsibility was on [her]", she went into the recording studio without the guidance of her record label or management.

According to Duff, she did not tell anyone at her record label that she was working with the Dead Executives. Joel, whom Duff had been dating at the time, was aware that she needed new material for a compilation album, and knew that she wanted a "totally different sound". Together, the Dead Executives went into the recording studio and worked on new music for Duff, before bringing her into the studio to collectively work on them. Duff described working with them as pleasant, and the music as a new milestone in her career, stating that working with "people you're close with makes a world of difference when you're recording and being creative." At the same time, Duff was also nervous about how her fans would react to the new music. Duff recorded four tracks for the album, three of which were co-written and produced with the Dead Executives.

Composition 

"Wake Up" is a mid-tempo dance-pop song  with "a more mature pop-techno sound" than Duff's previous work. She has described the song's genre as "very dancey, kind of pop – not '80s, but kind of with that in it." According to her, the song "makes you want to forget about all the pressure of dealing with your boss, or your teacher, or your mom, or [whoever]," and lyrically discusses "getting out and not forgetting to have some fun." Duff has also said that "it's really a catchy song but it talks about being in all my favorite places in the world, which is Tokyo and Paris and London and New York." The song is written in the key of E major and is set in common time, with a tempo of 118 beats per minute. Its instrumentation comes from a guitar, bass and drums. It features the sequence of E5—E/G#—A(#11) as its chord progression. Duff's vocal range spans exactly one octave, from C♯4–C♯5.

Critical reception 
Sal Cinquemani criticized the song's lyrics, calling them "insipid." Stephen Thomas Erlewine of Allmusic described the song as "a sweet-natured, slightly listless spin on Gwen Stefani's 'Cool,'" and according to him, it "sound[s] a bit like leftovers" from Duff's previous releases.

Chart performance 
In the United States, "Wake Up" was released to mainstream top 40 radio on July 12, 2005, Largely because of high digital download sales, the single entered the U.S. Billboard Hot 100 at number twenty-nine in mid-August, the week's highest debut. It spent two weeks in the top forty and six on the Hot 100, and it also reached the top forty on Billboard's Pop 100 chart. In October 2005, the RIAA certified "Wake Up" gold for its download sales.  As of July 27, 2014, the song had sold 437,000 digital copies in the United States.

"Wake Up" was more successful outside the U.S. It was released in the UK in late October and debuted at number seven, Duff's highest position on the singles chart there.

Music video 
The song's accompanying music video was directed by Marc Webb and was shot in Toronto, Ontario, Canada. Duff said, "I'm a huge fan of [the bands he's worked with], so I was really excited that he would direct my video." She added:

"The video moves really quickly and has all [these] quick pops. It shows me in Tokyo, London, Paris, New York, and it goes through all these different looks, [one] in each city, and it just shows that no matter where you are, people want [to do] the same things: they dance and they party. [...] The [style] looks kind of grainy and it's a totally different look for me."

It starts with Duff waking up on a couch, then sitting up to begin singing the song. Shortly after, the video cuts to a shot of her singing while sitting on a bench in her bedroom. After listening to music through headphones for a short while, she gets up, applies make-up, and puts on a black wig. She leaves her bedroom and rides around town in a car with several friends. She is then seen at various nightclubs in different cities. For the duration of the video, there are shots of her at different parties and clubs while she sings and clubgoers around her dance.

Track listings

Charts

Weekly charts

Year-end charts

Certifications

Release history

References 

Hilary Duff songs
2005 singles
2005 songs
Hollywood Records singles
Music videos directed by Marc Webb
Song recordings produced by the Dead Executives
Songs written by Benji Madden
Songs written by Hilary Duff
Songs written by Jay E
Songs written by Joel Madden